La Marmora may refer to:
 Punta La Marmora, a Sardinian mountain
 Alfonso Ferrero La Marmora (1804-1878), Italian general and statesman
 Alessandro Ferrero La Marmora (1799-1855), Italian general